This was the first edition of the tournament.

Darya Kustova and Olga Savchuk won the title defeating Natela Dzalamidze and Margarita Gasparyan in the final 6–0, 6–2.

Seeds

Draw

Draw

References
 Main Draw

Siberia Cup - Doubles
2011 Doubles
Siberia